Enucleation may refer to:

Enucleation (surgery), the removal of a mass without cutting into or dissecting it
Enucleation of the eye, removal of the eye that leaves the eye muscles and remaining orbital contents intact
Self-enucleation, self-inflicted removal of the eye
Enucleation (microbiology), removing the nucleus of a cell and replacing it with a different nucleus